Georges Camille Warenhorst (15 February 1862 – 6 December 1939) was a French sailor who competed in the 1900 Summer Olympics. He was a member of the boat Freia, which took the 6th place in the first race and the 5th place in the second race of 1 to 2 ton class.

Further reading

References

External links

1862 births
1939 deaths
Sailors at the 1900 Summer Olympics – 1 to 2 ton
French male sailors (sport)
Olympic sailors of France
Sportspeople from Paris
Place of death missing
Sailors at the 1900 Summer Olympics – Open class